City of New Orleans v. Dukes, 427 U.S. 297 (1976), was a 1976 United States Supreme Court decision.

Background
The original case involved a 1972 New Orleans ordinance banning all pushcart food vendors in the French Quarter except those who had continuously operated there for eight or more years. Two vendors had done so for twenty years or more and qualified under the grandfather clause. Appellee Dukes had operated a pushcart for only two years and challenged the ordinance, winning in the lower courts.

The decision
The City of New Orleans ordinance, authorized under state 'home rule' law, authorized under the Tenth Amendment State Police powers to protect the health, safety, welfare, and morals of its citizens - vs- Dukes' Fourteenth Amendment right of equal protection of the law:

The question for the court was whether the city of New Orleans' ordinance violated the equal protection clause of the 14th Amendment?

Per Curiam: No. Case was Reversed.

When local economic regulation is challenged solely as violating the Equal Protection Clause, this Court consistently defers to legislative determinations as to the desirability of particular statutory discriminations. Unless a classification trammels fundamental personal rights or is drawn upon inherently suspect distinctions such as race, religion, or alienage . . . any classifications other than these must only be rationally related to a legitimate state interest. . .States are accorded a wide latitude in the regulation of their local economies. . .

In short, the judiciary may not sit as a super legislature to judge the wisdom or desirability of legislative policy determinations made in areas that neither affect fundamental rights nor proceed along suspect lines.

[New Orleans] Classification rationally furthers the purpose which [the] city had identified as its objective in enacting the provision, that is, as a means 'to preserve the appearance and custom valued by the Quarter's residents and attractive to tourists.'

Further reading

External links
 

United States Supreme Court cases
United States Supreme Court cases of the Burger Court
United States Supreme Court decisions that overrule a prior Supreme Court decision
United States equal protection case law
1972 in United States case law